Czechoslovakia competed at the 1948 Summer Olympics in London, England. Eighty-seven competitors, 73 men and 14 women, took part in 55 events in 11 sports.

Twenty-six-year-old Emil Zátopek won the gold medal in the 10-kilometre run on the first day (his third race at that distance). On the second day he added a silver medal in the 5 km run. Czechoslovak canoeists were also very successful (gaining three gold and one silver medal), Jan Brzák-Felix successfully defended his medal that he had won 12 years earlier in 1936 Summer Olympics with another partner, Václav Havel and Jiří Pecka won a silver medal using a 12-year-old boat from the 1936 Olympics. Boxer Július Torma won the gold medal in the Welterweight class, although he had injured his left arm before the semi-final. Women's gymnastics team also secured gold medals, but this victory was overshadowed by the death of their teammate Eliška Misáková, who succumbed to polio in London.

Medalists

Athletics

Basketball

Boxing

Canoeing

Fencing

Five fencers, all men, represented Czechoslovakia in 1948.

Men's sabre
 Alois Sokol
 Svatopluk Skýva
 Jaroslav Starý

Men's team sabre
 Jindřich Kakos, Svatopluk Skýva, Jaroslav Starý, Alois Sokol, Jindřich Chmela

Gymnastics

Modern pentathlon

Two male pentathletes represented Czechoslovakia in 1948.

 Karel Bártů
 Otto Jemelka

Rowing

Czechoslovakia had four male rowers participate in one out of seven rowing events in 1948.

 Men's coxless four
 Václav Roubík
 Josef Kalaš
 Josef Schejbal
 Jiří Vaněk

Swimming

Wrestling

Art competitions

References

External links
Official Olympic Reports
International Olympic Committee results database
Czech Olympic Report

Nations at the 1948 Summer Olympics
1948
Summer Olympics